Umreth (Gujarati: ઉમરેઠ) is a taluka and the administrative center of Anand District in the state of Gujarat, India. It is administered by Umreth Nagarpalika. It is part of the region known as Charotar, located in Anand and Kheda districts.

Umreth is also known as the Silk City of Charotar. It became famous for silk sarees and its Pol culture. It commonly looks like Harappa architecture. Umreth lines between Dwarka, Nadiad and Dakor on the State Highway known as “PragatiPath”. It is connected with Baroda, Anand, Nadiad, Ahmedabad, Godhra, Kapadvanj, and Balasinor via roadway. The railway line is broad gauge connecting it to Godhra, covering the Dakor route from Anand. You may Visit Blog Regarding Umreth By Vivek Doshi of Umreth.

Umreth has seen rapid economic growth along the Umreth-Dakor and Nadiad-Dakor road belt. Umreth has an own GIDC Estate, Mainly timber industries and Mamra (Puffed Rice) industries are well developed in Umreth. But still puffed rice industries need support from the government to stay viable.

About Umreth Taluka
Umreth is a Taluka in Anand District of Gujarat, India. It is located 22 km to the north of District headquarters Anand. 78 km from State capital Gandhinagar to the north.

Umreth Taluka is bounded by Mahudha Taluka to the north, Nadiad Taluka to the west, Kathlal Taluka to the north, Thasra Taluka to the east. Umreth City, Nadiad City, Anand City are the nearby cities to Umreth.

Umreth consists of 91 villages and 38 panchayats. It is at 44 m elevation. This place is in the border of the Anand District and Kheda District. Kheda District Mahudha is north towards this place.

Dakor is considered the most important pilgrimage nearby having grand temple of Lord Krishna and receives visitors in millions every year.

Anand, Kheda (Kaira), Baroda (Vadodara), Pavagadh, Ahmedabad, Dakor are the nearby important tourist destinations.

List of villages in Umreth

 Ahima
 Ardi
 Ashipura
 Badapura
 Bajipura
 Bechari
 Bhalej
 Bharoda
 Bhatpura
 Dagjipura
 Dholi
Dhuleta
 Fatepura
 Gangapura
 Ghora
 Hamidpura
 Jakhala
 Jitpura
 Khankhanpur
 Khankuva
 Khorwad
 Lingda
 Meghva-badapura
 Navapura
 Pansora
 Parvata
 Pratappura
 Ratanpura
 Saiyadpura
 Sadarpura
 Sundalpura
 Sureli
 Tajpura
 Thamna
 Untkhari
 VansolZala Bordi

Geography
It has an average elevation of 47 metres (154 feet).

Demographics
 India census, Umreth had a population of 32,191. Males constitute 52% of the population and females 48%. Umreth has an average literacy rate of 71%, higher than the national average of 59.5%: male literacy is 78%, and female literacy is 63%. In Umreth, 12% of the population is under 6 years of age.

Gujarati is the local language here. Also People Speaks Hindi. Total population of Umreth Taluka is 162,428 living in 30,250 Houses, Spread across total 91 villages and 38 panchayats. Males are 84,714 and females are 77,714; Total 32,191 persons live in town and 130,237 live rurally.

Weather and climate
It is too Hot in summer. Umreth summer temperature lies between 32 °C to 45 °C . Average temperatures of January is 20 °C, February is 23 °C, March is 28 °C, April is 32 °C, May is 36 °C .

References

Talukas of Gujarat
Anand district